Juan y la Borrega (or Juan and la Borrega) is a 2011 Mexican short drama/thriller by Mexican director J. Xavier Velasco.

Background
Inspired by his observations of public criticism of violence in real life situations, director J. Xavier Velasco took about a year to complete this project.  The film debuted at the Guadalajara International Film Festival in March 2010, and had its world premiere at Cannes Film Festival Court Métrage  in 2011.

Plot
Juan (Manuel Domínguez) is an employee of a uniform store was comfortable in his routine, uninspired, and mundane life until he meets "La Borrega" (The Lamb) (Carlos Aragón), a cruel man who tortures Juan.

Cast
 Edgar Vivar as Enrique 
 Manuel Domínguez as Juan 
 Carlos Aragón as La Borrega

References

External links
 

Mexican short films
Mexican thriller drama films
2010s Spanish-language films
2010s Mexican films